The Tannhorn is a mountain of the Emmental Alps in Switzerland. It lies to the west of the Brienzer Rothorn and to the east of the Augstmatthorn. On its southern side it overlooks Lake Brienz.

Administratively, the summit is shared by the municipalities of Brienz, to the south and east, Oberried am Brienzersee, to the west, and Flühli, to the north-east. Brienz and Oberried am Brienzersee are in the canton of Bern, whilst Flühli is in the canton of Lucerne. The Tannhorn is the southernmost point in the canton of Lucerne.

References

External links
 Tannhorn on Hikr

Mountains of the Alps
Mountains of Switzerland
Emmental Alps
Mountains of the canton of Bern
Mountains of the canton of Lucerne
Bern–Lucerne border
Two-thousanders of Switzerland